Keith Trevillian Rawle (29 October 1924 – 6 March 2005) was an Australian rules footballer who played for Essendon in the Victorian Football League (VFL) during the 1940s.

Family
He was the son of former North Melbourne and Essendon footballer George Rawle.

Football
Rawle usually played as a forward pocket and had two stints with Essendon. He was a member of Essendon premiership teams in 1946 and again in 1949 when he kicked three goals in what would be his last game.

He also played in three losing Grand Final sides, all of which were close games. In 1943 his team lost to Richmond by five points, in 1947 they were defeated by a point to Carlton and in 1948 Essendon lost a Grand Final replay to Melbourne after drawing the original game.

War service
During World War II, from 1942 to 1946, Rawle served in the Royal Australian Air Force.

Cricket
In 1948 he played a first-class cricket match for Victoria against Tasmania in Hobart and made 10 runs.

See also
 List of Victoria first-class cricketers

Notes

External links
 

1924 births
2005 deaths
Essendon Football Club players
Essendon Football Club Premiership players
Redan Football Club players
Australian cricketers
Victoria cricketers
Australian people of Cornish descent
Royal Australian Air Force personnel of World War II
Cricketers from Melbourne
Australian rules footballers from Melbourne
Two-time VFL/AFL Premiership players
People from Essendon, Victoria